Teimuraz (also spelled as Teymuraz, Taimuraz or Taymuraz) is a Georgian male name derived from the Persian Tahmuras, a name of the legendary "third shah of the world" according to Ferdowsi’s Shahnameh.

Notable people with the name include:

Rulers, politicians and ambassadors
 Teimuraz Bagrationi
 Teimuraz of Imereti
 Teimuraz I of Kakheti
 Teimuraz II of Kakheti, known as Teimuraz II of Georgia
 Taymuraz Mamsurov, head of Republic of North Ossetia–Alania, Russia
 Teimuraz Ramishvili, Russian diplomat

Sportsmen
 Gagamaru Masaru, sumo wrestler from Georgia, born as Teimuraz Jugheli
 Teymuraz Gabashvili, Russian tennis player
 Teymuraz Gongadze, Georgian football player
 Teimuraz Kakulia, tennis player and  Soviet/Georgian tennis coach
 Teimuraz Sharashenidze, Georgian football player
 Taimuraz Tigiyev, Kazakhstani wrestler

Georgian masculine given names